Eucalyptus bridgesiana, commonly known as apple box, apple, apple gum or but-but, is a medium to large sized tree. It has rough, fibrous bark on the trunk and larger branches, smooth grey bark above, glossy green, lance-shaped adult leaves, flower buds in groups of seven, white flowers and hemispherical fruit.

Description
It has rough, fibrous, mottled grey and white, sometimes tessellated bark on the trunk and larger branches, with rough, grey, fibrous bark on its trunk and larger branches. Thinner branches have smooth grey bark with whitish patches, shed in short ribbons. Flowering occurs from February to March and the flowers are white.

Taxonomy and naming
Eucalyptus bridgesiana was first formally described in 1898 by Richard Thomas Baker and the description was published in Proceedings of the Linnean Society of New South Wales. The specific epithet (bridgesiana) honours Frederick Bridges (1840-1904) for his "promoting the opplication of economic science to our indigenous vegetable products".

Distribution and habitat
Apple box grows in open woodland and forest and is widespread from near Stanthorpe in Queensland and south through the slopes and ranges of New South Wales and eastern Victoria.

Uses
The wood of apple box is softer than that of other eucalypts, and is considered poor for firewood or building timber.  However, the honey produced by bees feeding on the small white flowers of the tree is of high quality.

References

bridgesiana
Flora of New South Wales
Flora of the Australian Capital Territory
Flora of Victoria (Australia)
Flora of Queensland
Myrtales of Australia
Plants described in 1898
Trees of Australia
Taxa named by Richard Thomas Baker